Courtenay Charles Evan Morgan, 1st Viscount Tredegar, CBE, KStJ, VD (10 April 1867 – 3 May 1934), was a Welsh peer.

Morgan was born at Ruperra Castle near Newport, Monmouthshire, and educated at Eton College.  He was the eldest son of the Honourable Frederick Courtenay Morgan, of Ruperra Castle, third son of Charles Morgan, 1st Baron Tredegar. His mother was Charlotte Anne, daughter of Charles Alexander Williamson, of Lawers, Perthshire. He succeeded his uncle Godfrey Morgan, 1st Viscount Tredegar, as third Baron Tredegar in 1913.

Tredegar was appointed a captain in the Royal Monmouthshire Royal Engineers on 30 December 1891, and was later promoted an honorary major. In early 1900 he was Aide-de-camp to Sir Thomas Fraser, Commandant Royal School of Military Engineering at Chatham and Commanding the Thames District.

Tredegar was a minor cricketer who played at county level for Shropshire between 1896 and 1898 while playing at club level for Ludlow.

In the 1906 General Election he unsuccessfully stood as Conservative candidate for South Monmouthshire, losing the seat to the Liberals in a national landslide for that party.

One of Lord Tredegar's first acts after his succession was to purchase the steam yacht Liberty, which almost immediately was requisitioned by the Royal Navy for use as a hospital ship. He left his home and went back to serve in the First World War, taking command of his yacht for the first part of the war. He was granted the temporary rank of lieutenant in the Royal Naval Volunteer Reserve, soon promoted to temporary commander. After the end of hostilities, he embarked on a world cruise, eventually going around the world twice during which he visited every colony in the British Empire and every state in the Commonwealth of Australia.

Tredegar was promoted to captain in the RNVR in 1921 and appointed a naval aide-de-camp to the King in 1925, but was placed on the retired list in 1926. In 1926 the viscountcy was revived when he was created Viscount Tredegar, of Tredegar in the County of Monmouth. He is not recorded as having spoken in the House of Lords. In 1933 he was appointed Lord Lieutenant of Monmouthshire, a post he held until his death the following year.

Lord Tredegar married Lady Katharine Agnes Blanche, daughter of James Carnegie, 9th Earl of Southesk, in 1890. He died in May 1934, aged 67, at the Ritz Hotel in Westminster, London after his return from a health trip to Australia. He was succeeded in the viscountcy and ownership of Tredegar House by his eccentric and bohemian son, Evan Morgan, 2nd Viscount Tredegar.

Katharine, Viscountess Tredegar died in London in 1949, only a few months after her son Evan. The Hon. Gwyneth Ericka Morgan, only daughter of Courtenay and Katharine, died in mysterious circumstances following her disappearance in 1924.

References

1867 births
1934 deaths
Viscounts in the Peerage of the United Kingdom
Lord-Lieutenants of Monmouthshire
Commanders of the Order of the British Empire
Royal Navy officers of World War I
Royal Naval Volunteer Reserve personnel of World War I
Royal Engineers officers
Conservative Party (UK) hereditary peers
Viscounts created by George V
Conservative Party (UK) parliamentary candidates